This is a list of capital cities of the United States, including places that serve or have served as federal, state, insular area, territorial, colonial and Native American capitals.

Washington has been the federal capital of the United States since 1800. Each U.S. state has its own capital city, as do many of its insular areas. Most states have not changed their capital city since becoming a state, but the capital cities of their respective preceding colonies, territories, kingdoms, and republics typically changed multiple times. There have also been other governments within the current borders of the United States with their own capitals, such as the Republic of Texas, Native American nations, and other unrecognized governments.

National capitals 

The buildings in cities identified in below chart served either as official capitals of the United States under the United States Constitution, or, prior to its ratification, sites where the Second Continental Congress or Congress of the Confederation met. The United States did not have a permanent capital under the Articles of Confederation.

The U.S. Constitution was ratified in 1787, and gave the Congress the power to exercise "exclusive legislation" over a district that "may, by Cession of particular States, and the acceptance of Congress, become the Seat of the Government of the United States." The 1st Congress met at Federal Hall in New York. In 1790, it passed the Residence Act, which established the national capital at a site along the Potomac River that would become Washington, D.C. For the next ten years, Philadelphia served as the temporary capital. There, Congress met at Congress Hall. On November 17, 1800, the 6th United States Congress formally convened in Washington, D.C. Congress has met outside of Washington only twice since: on July 16, 1987, at Independence Hall in Philadelphia, to commemorate the 200th anniversary of ratification of the Constitution; and at Federal Hall National Memorial in New York on September 6, 2002, to mark the first anniversary of the September 11 attacks. Both meetings were ceremonial.

On July 2, 1923, President Warren G. Harding commented in a speech (or, as a historic marker tells it, "reporters noted")  that the little town of Meacham, Oregon, was the nation's capital "all day long".

State capitals
Each state has a capital that serves as the seat of its government. Ten of the thirteen original states and 15 other states have changed their capital city at least once; the last state to move its capital city was Oklahoma in 1910.

In the following table, the "Since" column shows the year that the city began serving as the state's capital (or the capital of the entities that preceded it). The MSA/µSA and CSA columns display the population of the metro area the city is a part of, and should not be construed to mean the population of the city's sphere of influence or that the city is an anchor for the metro area. Fields colored light yellow denote that the population is a micropolitan statistical area.

Insular area capitals
An insular area is a United States territory that is neither a part of one of the fifty states nor a part of the District of Columbia, the nation's federal district. Those insular areas with territorial capitals are listed below.

Former national capitals
Two of the 50 U.S. states, Hawaii and Texas, were once de jure sovereign states with diplomatic recognition from the international community.

Hawaii
During its history as a sovereign nation (Kingdom of Hawaii, 1795–1893; Republic of Hawaii, 1894–1898), five sites served as the capital of Hawaii:
 Waikīkī, 1795–1796
 Hilo, 1796–1803
 Honolulu, 1803–1812
 Kailua-Kona, 1812–1820
 Lahaina, 1820–1845
 Honolulu, 1845–1898
Annexed by the United States in 1898, Honolulu remained the capital, first of the Territory of Hawaii (1900–1959), and then of the state (since 1959).

Texas
During its history as a sovereign nation (Republic of Texas, 1836–1845), seven sites served as the capital of Texas:
 Washington (now Washington-on-the-Brazos), 1836
 Harrisburg (now part of Houston), 1836
 Galveston, 1836
 Velasco, 1836
 West Columbia, 1836
 Houston, 1837–1839
 Austin, 1839–1845
Annexed by the United States in 1845, Austin remains the capital of the state of Texas.

Native American capitals 

Some Native American tribes, in particular the Five Civilized Tribes, organized their states with constitutions and capitals in Western style. Others, like the Iroquois, had long-standing, pre-Columbian traditions of a 'capitol' longhouse where wampum and council fires were maintained with special status. Since they did business with the U.S. Federal Government, these capitals can be seen as officially recognized in some sense.

Cherokee Nation 
 New Echota 1825–1832
New Echota, now near Calhoun, Georgia, was founded in 1825, realizing the dream and plans of Cherokee Chief Major Ridge. Major Ridge chose the site because of its centrality in the historic Cherokee Nation which spanned parts of Georgia, North Carolina, Tennessee and Alabama, and because it was near the confluence of the Conasauga and Coosawattee rivers. The town's layout was partly inspired by Ridge's many visits to Washington D.C. and to Baltimore, but also invoked traditional themes of the Southeastern ceremonial complex. Complete with the Council House, Supreme Court, Cherokee syllabary printing press, and the houses of several of the Nation's constitutional officers, New Echota served as the capital until 1832 when the state of Georgia outlawed Native American assembly in an attempt to undermine the Nation. Thousands of Cherokee would gather in New Echota for the annual National Councils, camping along the nearby rivers and holding long stomp dances in the park-like woods that were typical of many Southeastern Native American settlements.

 Red Clay 1832–1838
The Cherokee National council grounds were moved to Red Clay, Tennessee, on the Georgia state line, in order to evade the Georgia state militia. The log cabins, limestone springs, and park-like woods of Red Clay served as the capital until the Cherokee Nation was removed to Indian Territory (Oklahoma) on the Trail of Tears. 
 Tahlequah 1839–1907, 1938–present
Tahlequah, in present-day Oklahoma, served as the capital of the original Cherokee Nation after Removal. After the Civil War, a turbulent period for the Nation which was involved in its own civil war resulting from pervasive anger and disagreements over removal from Georgia, the Cherokee Nation built a new National Capitol in Tahlequah out of brick. The building served as the capitol until 1907, when the Dawes Act finally dissolved the Cherokee Nation and Tahlequah became the county seat of Cherokee County, Oklahoma. The Cherokee National government was re-established in 1938 and Tahlequah remains the capital of the modern Cherokee Nation; it is also the capital of the United Keetoowah Band of Cherokee Indians.
 Cherokee 20th century–present (Eastern Band of Cherokee)
Approximately four to eight hundred Cherokees escaped removal because they lived on a separated tract, purchased later with the help of Confederate Colonel William Holland Thomas, along the Oconaluftee River deep in the Smoky Mountains of North Carolina. Some Cherokees fleeing the Federal Army, sent for the "round up," fled to the remote settlements separated from the rest of the Cherokee Territory in Georgia and North Carolina, in order to remain in their homeland. In the 20th century, their descendants organized as the Eastern Band of Cherokee Indians; its capital is at Cherokee, North Carolina, in the tribally-controlled Qualla Boundary.

Muscogee Creek Nation 
 Hot Springs, Arkansas c. 1837–1866
After Removal from their Alabama-Georgia homeland, the Creek national government met near Hot Springs which was then part of their new territory as prescribed in the Treaty of Cusseta. Because some Creeks fought with the Confederacy in the American Civil War, the Union forced the Creeks to cede over  - half of their land in what is now Arkansas.
 Okmulgee 1867–1906
Served as the National capital after the American Civil War. It was probably named after Ocmulgee, on the Ocmulgee river in Macon, a principle Coosa and later Creek town built with mounds and functioning as part of the Southeastern ceremonial complex. However, there were other traditional Creek "mother-towns" before removal. The Ocmulgee mounds were ceded illegally in 1821 with the Treaty of Indian Springs.

Iroquois Confederacy 
 Onondaga (Onondaga privilege c. 1450–present)
The Iroquois Confederacy or Haudenosaunee, which means "People of the Longhouse," was an alliance between the Five and later Six-Nations of Iroquoian language and culture of upstate New York. These include the Seneca, Cayuga, Onondaga, Oneida, Mohawk, and, after 1722, the Tuscarora Nations. Since the Confederacy's formation around 1450, the Onondaga Nation has held privilege of hosting the Iroquois Grand Council and the status of Keepers of the Fire and the Wampum —which they still do at the official Longhouse on the Onondaga Reservation. Now spread over reservations in New York and Ontario, the Six Nations of the Haudenosaunee preserve this arrangement to this day in what they claim to be the "world's oldest representative democracy."

Seneca Nation of Indians 
 Jimerson Town (Allegany Reservation)
 Irving (Cattaraugus Reservation)

The Seneca Nation republic was founded in 1848 and has two capitals that rotate responsibilities every two years. Jimerson Town was founded in the 1960s following the formation of the Allegheny Reservoir. The Senecas also have an administrative longhouse in Steamburg but do not consider that location to be a capital.

Navajo Nation
 Window Rock
Window Rock (Navajo: Tségháhoodzání), Arizona, is a small city that serves as the seat of government and capital of the Navajo Nation (1936–present), the largest territory of a sovereign Native American nation in North America. It lies within the boundaries of the St. Michaels Chapter, adjacent to the Arizona and New Mexico state line. Window Rock hosts the Navajo Nation governmental campus which contains the Navajo Nation Council, Navajo Nation Supreme Court, the offices of the Navajo Nation President and Vice President, and many Navajo government buildings.

Unrecognized national capitals
There have been a handful of self-declared or undeclared nations within the current borders of the United States which were never officially recognized as legally independent sovereign entities; however, these nations did have de facto control over their respective regions during their existence.

Colonies of British America

Prior to the independence of the United States from Great Britain, declared July 4, 1776, several congresses were convened on behalf of some of the colonies of British America. However, these bodies did not address the question of independence from England, and therefore did not designate a national capital. (The Second Continental Congress encompassed the period during which the United States declared independence, but did not itself establish a national capital.)

Vermont Republic
Before joining the United States as the fourteenth state, Vermont was an independent republic known as the Vermont Republic (1777–1791). Three cities served as the capital of the Republic:
Westminster, 1777
Windsor, 1777–?
Castleton, ?–1791

The current capital of the State of Vermont is Montpelier.

State of Franklin
The State of Franklin was an autonomous, secessionist United States territory created not long after the end of the American Revolution from territory that later was ceded by North Carolina to the federal government. Franklin's territory later became part of the state of Tennessee. Franklin was never officially admitted into the Union of the United States and existed for only four years.
Jonesborough, Tennessee, 1784–?
Greeneville, Tennessee, 1785?–?

State of Muskogee
The State of Muskogee was a Native American state in Spanish Florida created by the Englishman William Augustus Bowles, who was its "Director General," author of its Constitution, and designer of its flag. It consisted of several tribes of Creeks and Seminoles. It existed from 1799 to 1803. It had one capital:
Miccosukee, 1799–1803

Republic of West Florida
The Republic of West Florida was a short-lived nation that broke away from the territory of Spanish West Florida in 1810.  It comprised the Florida Parishes of the modern state of Louisiana and the Mobile District of the modern states of Mississippi and Alabama. (The Republic of West Florida did not include any part of the modern state of Florida.) Ownership of the area had been in dispute between Spain and the United States, which claimed that it had been included in the Louisiana Purchase of 1803. Within two months of the settlers' rebellion and the declaration of an independent nation, President James Madison sent American forces to peaceably occupy the new republic. It was formally annexed by the United States in 1812 over the objections of Spain and the land was divided between the Territory of Orleans and Territory of Mississippi. During its brief existence, the capital of the Republic of West Florida was:
St. Francisville, Louisiana, 1810

Republic of Indian Stream
The Republic of Indian Stream was an unrecognized independent nation within the present state of New Hampshire.
The area that would become Pittsburg, New Hampshire, 1832–1835

California Republic
Before being annexed by the United States in 1848 (following the Mexican–American War), a small portion of north-central California declared itself the California Republic, in an act of independence from Mexico, in 1846 (see Bear Flag Revolt).  The republic only existed a month before it disbanded itself, to join the advancing American army and therefore became part of the United States.

The very short-lived California Republic was never recognized by the United States, Mexico or any other nation.  The flag, featuring a silhouette of a California grizzly bear, a star, and the words "California Republic", became known as the Bear Flag and was later the basis for the official state flag of California.

There was one de facto capital of the California Republic:
Sonoma, 1846

Confederate States

The Confederate States of America (C.S.A.) had two capitals during its existence. The first capital was established February 4, 1861, in Montgomery, Alabama, and remained there until it was moved to Richmond, Virginia, on May 29, 1861, after Virginia seceded on May 23.

The individual state capitals remained the same in the Confederacy as they had been in the Union (U.S.A.), although as the advancing Union Army used those cities for military districts, some of the Confederate governments were relocated or moved out of state, traveling along with secessionist armies.

 Montgomery, February 4, 1861 – May 29, 1861
 Richmond, May 29, 1861 – April 3, 1865

Historical state, colonial, and territorial capitals
Most of the original Thirteen Colonies had their capitals occupied or attacked by the British during the American Revolutionary War.  State governments operated where and as they could.  The City of New York was occupied by British troops from 1776 to 1783.  A similar situation occurred during the War of 1812, during the American Civil War in many Confederate states, and during the Pueblo Revolt of 1680–1692 in New Mexico.

Twenty-two state capitals have been a capital longer than their state has been a state, since they served as the capital of a predecessor territory, colony, or republic. Boston, Massachusetts, has been a capital city since 1630; it is the oldest continuously-running capital in the United States. Santa Fe, New Mexico, is the oldest capital city, having become capital in 1610 and interrupted only by the aforementioned Pueblo Revolt. An even older Spanish city, St. Augustine, Florida, served as a colonial capital from 1565 until about 1820, more than 250 years.

The table below includes the following information:
The state, the year in which statehood was granted, and the state's capital are shown in bold type.  NOTE: For the first thirteen states, formerly the Thirteen Colonies of Great Britain on the Atlantic seaboard, the year of statehood is shown as 1776 (United States Declaration of Independence) rather than the subsequent year each state ratified the 1787 United States Constitution. (See List of U.S. states by date of admission to the Union.) 
The year listed for each capital is the starting date; the ending date is the starting date for the successor unless otherwise indicated.
In many cases, capital cities of historical jurisdictions were outside of a state's present borders. (Those cities are generally indicated with the two-letter abbreviation for the U.S. state in which the former administrative capital is now located.)

{|class=wikitable
|+Historical capitals in the United States of America
!State!!Capital!!Date!!Notes
|- style="border-top: solid 2px #000"
|rowspan=19|AlabamaStatehood in 1819
|San Agustín (FL)||1565||Capital of the Spanish colony of La Florida.
|-
|rowspan=3|Savannah (GA)||1733||Capital of the British proprietary Colony of Georgia.
|-
|1755||Capital of the British Province of Georgia.
|-
|1776||rowspan=9|Capitals of the State of Georgia.
|-
|Augusta (GA)||1778
|-
|Heard's Fort (GA)||1780
|-
|Augusta (GA)||1781
|-
|Savannah (GA)||1782
|-
|Ebenezer (GA)||1782
|-
|Savannah (GA)||1784
|-
|Augusta (GA)||1786
|-
|Louisville (GA)||1796
|-
|Natchez (MS)||1798||rowspan=2|Capitals of the Mississippi Territory.
|-
|Washington (MS)||1802
|-
|St. Stephens||1817||Capital of the Alabama Territory.
|-
|Huntsville||1819||rowspan=3|Capitals of the State of Alabama.
|-
|Cahawba||1820
|-
|Tuscaloosa||1826
|-
|Montgomery||1846||Capital of the State of Alabama.(Capital of the Confederate States of America in 1861.)
|- style="border-top: solid 2px #000"
|rowspan=6|AlaskaStatehood in 1959
|rowspan=3|Novo-ArkhangelskSitka||1808||Capital of the Russian colony of Alaska.
|-
|1867||Capital of the Department of Alaska.
|-
|1900||rowspan=2|Capitals of the District of Alaska.
|-
|rowspan=3|Juneau||1906
|-
|1912||Capital of the Territory of Alaska.
|-
|1959||Capital of the State of Alaska.
|- style="border-top: solid 2px #000"
|rowspan=10|ArizonaStatehood in 1912
|rowspan=2|Santa Fe (NM)||1848||Capital of the U.S. provisional government of New Mexico 1848–1850.
|-
|1850||Capital of the U.S. Territory of New Mexico 1850–1912.
|-
|Mesilla (NM)||1862||Capital of the Confederate Territory of Arizona (southern New Mexico and Arizona 1862).
|-
|San Antonio (TX)||1862||Capital of the government-in-exile of the Confederate Territory of Arizona 1862–1865.
|-
|Fort Whipple||1864||rowspan=5|Capitals of the U.S. Territory of Arizona.
|-
|Prescott||1864
|-
|Tucson||1867
|-
|Prescott||1877
|-
|rowspan=2|Phoenix||1889
|-
|1912||Capital of the State of Arizona.
|- style="border-top: solid 2px #000"
|rowspan=8|ArkansasStatehood in 1836
|rowspan = 5|Saint-LouisSan LuisSt. Louis (MO)||1765||Capital of the Spanish (though predominantly Francophone) district of Alta Louisiana.
|-
|1800||Capital of the French district of La Haute-Louisiane.
|-
|1804||Capital of the District of Louisiana (under the authority of the Indiana Territory).
|-
|1805||Capital of the Louisiana Territory.
|-
|1812||Capital of the Missouri Territory.
|-
|Arkansas Post||1819||rowspan=2|Capitals of the Arkansaw Territory.
|-
|rowspan=2|Little Rock||1821
|-
|1836||Capital of the State of Arkansas.(Washington was the Confederate state capital 1863–1865.)
|- style="border-top: solid 2px #000"
|rowspan=10|CaliforniaStatehood in 1850
|Loreto (BCS)||1770||rowspan=2|Capitals of the Spanish Virreinato de la Nueva España colonies of las Californias.
|-
|rowspan=5|Presidio Reál de San Carlos de MontereyMonterey||1777
|-
|1804||Capital of the Spanish Virreinato de la Nueva España province of Alta California.
|-
|1821||Capital of the Mexican province of Alta California.
|-
|1846||Capital of the U.S. military government of California.
|-
|1849||Capital of the Provisional Government of California.
|-
|Pueblo de San José de Guadalupe||1850||rowspan=4|Capitals of the State of California.
|-
|Vallejo||1852
|-
|Benicia||1853
|-
|Sacramento||1854
|- style="border-top: solid 2px #000"
|rowspan=7|ColoradoStatehood in 1876
|Denver City{||1859||rowspan=2|Capitals of the extralegal Territory of Jefferson.
|-
|Golden City||1860
|-
|Denver City||1861||rowspan=4|Capitals of the Territory of Colorado.
|-
|Colorado City||1862
|-
|Golden City||1862
|-
|rowspan=2|Denver||1867
|-
|1876||Capital of the State of Colorado.
|- style="border-top: solid 2px #000"
|rowspan=9|ConnecticutStatehood in 1776
|Fort Amsterdam (NY)||1625||Capital of the Netherlands colony of New Netherland.
|-
|Hartford||1639||Capital of the English Colony of Connecticut 1639–1686.
|-
|New-Haven||1640||Capital of the English Colony of New-Haven until its merger into the Connecticut Colony in 1662.
|-
|Boston (MA)||1686||Capital of the English Dominion of New-England in America.
|-
|Hartford||1689||Capital of the English Colony of Connecticut.
|-
|rowspan=3|joint capitals||1701||Hartford and New-Haven served as the "co-capitals" of the English Colony of Connecticut, with the Assembly holding its May session in Hartford and its October session in New-Haven.
|-
|1707||Hartford and New-Haven joint capitals of the British Colony of Connecticut.
|-
|1776||Hartford and New Haven joint capitals of the State of Connecticut.
|-
|Hartford||1875||Capital of the State of Connecticut.
|- style="border-top: solid 2px #000"
|rowspan=10|DelawareStatehood in 1776
|Fort Kristina||1638||Capital of the Swedish colony of Nya Sverige.
|-
|rowspan=4|Fort AmsterdamNieuw-AmsterdamNew-YorkNieuw-OranjeNew-York (NY)||1655||Capital of the Dutch province of New Netherland.
|-
|1664||Capital of the English Colony of New-York.
|-
|1673||Capital of the Dutch military government of New Netherland.
|-
|1674||Capital of the English Colony of New-York.
|-
|Philadelphia (PA)||1682||Capital of the English Colony of Pennsylvania.
|-
|rowspan=3|New Castle||1704||Capital of the English Lower Counties on the Delaware.
|-
|1707||Capital of the British Lower Counties on the Delaware.
|-
|1776||rowspan=2|Capitals of the State of Delaware.
|-
|Dover||1777
|- style="border-top: solid 2px #000"
|rowspan=8|FloridaStatehood in 1845
|Fort de la Caroline||1564||Capital of the French colony of La Caroline 1564–1565.
|-
|rowspan=3|San AgustínSt. Augustine||1565||Capital of the Spanish province of La Florida 1565–1763.
|-
|1763||Capital of the British province of East Florida 1763–1783.
|-
|1783||Capital of the Spanish province of Florida Oriental 1783–1821.
|-
|rowspan=2|Santa María de OchusePensacola||1763||Capital of the British province of British West Florida 1763–1783.
|-
|1783||Capital of the Spanish province of Florida Occidental 1783–1821.
|-
|rowspan=2|Tallahassee||1824||Capital of the Florida Territory.
|-
|1845||Capital of the State of Florida.
|- style="border-top: solid 2px #000"
|rowspan=16|GeorgiaStatehood in 1776
|San Agustín (FL)||1565||Capital of the Spanish province of La Florida.
|-
|rowspan=3|Savannah||1733||Capital of the British proprietary Colony of Georgia.
|-
|1755||Capital of the British Province of Georgia.
|-
|1776||rowspan=13|Capitals of the State of Georgia.
|-
|Augusta||1778
|-
|Heard's Fort||1780
|-
|Augusta||1781
|-
|Savannah||1782
|-
|Ebenezer||1782
|-
|Savannah||1784
|-
|Augusta||1786
|-
|Louisville||1796
|-
|Milledgeville||1807
|-
|Macon||1864
|-
|Milledgeville||1865
|-
|Atlanta||1868
|- style="border-top: solid 2px #000"
|rowspan=5|HawaiiStatehood in 1959
|Lahaina||1820||rowspan=2|Capitals of the Kingdom of Hawaii.
|-
|rowspan=4|Honolulu||1845
|-
|1894||Capital of the Republic of Hawaii.
|-
|1898||Capital of the Territory of Hawaii.
|-
|1959||Capital of the State of Hawaii.
|- style="border-top: solid 2px #000"
|rowspan=7|IdahoStatehood in 1890
|rowspan=2|Oregon City (OR)||1843||Capital of the Provisional Government of Oregon in the Oregon Country.
|-
|1848||rowspan=2|Capitals of the Territory of Oregon (all of Idaho 1848–1853, southern Idaho 1853–1859).
|-
|Salem (OR)||1851
|-
|Olympia (WA)||1853||Capital of the Territory of Washington (northern Idaho 1853–1859, all of Idaho 1859–1863).
|-
|Lewiston||1863||rowspan=2|Capitals of the Territory of Idaho.
|-
|rowspan=2|Boise||1865
|-
|1890||Capital of the State of Idaho.
|- style="border-top: solid 2px #000"
|rowspan=6|IllinoisStatehood in 1818
|Marietta (OH)||1788||Capital of the Territory Northwest of the River Ohio.
|-
|Vincennes (IN)||1800||Capital of the Territory of Indiana.
|-
|rowspan=2|Kaskaskia||1809||Capital of the Territory of Illinois.
|-
|1818||rowspan=3|Capitals of the State of Illinois.
|-
|Vandalia||1820
|-
|Springfield||1839
|- style="border-top: solid 2px #000"
|rowspan=5|IndianaStatehood in 1816
|Marietta (OH)||1788||Capital of the Territory Northwest of the River Ohio.
|-
|Vincennes||1800||rowspan=2|Capitals of the Territory of Indiana.
|-
|rowspan=2|Corydon||1813
|-
|1816||rowspan=2|Capitals of the State of Indiana.
|-
|Indianapolis||1825
|- style="border-top: solid 2px #000"
|rowspan=12|IowaStatehood in 1846
|rowspan = 5|Saint-LouisSan LuisSt. Louis (MO)||1765||Capital of the Spanish (though predominantly Francophone) district of Alta Louisiana.
|-
|1800||Capital of the French district of La Haute-Louisiane.
|-
|1804||Capital of the District of Louisiana (under the authority of the Indiana Territory).
|-
|1805||Capital of the Louisiana Territory.
|-
|1812||Capital of the Missouri Territory (1812–1821).
|-
|Detroit (MI)||1834||Capital of the Territory of Michigan.
|-
|Belmont (WI)||1836||rowspan=2|Capitals of the Territory of Wisconsin.
|-
|rowspan=2|Burlington||1837
|-
|1838||rowspan=2|Capitals of the Territory of Iowa.
|-
|rowspan=2|Iowa City||1841
|-
|1846||rowspan=2|Capitals of the State of Iowa.
|-
|Des Moines||1857
|- style="border-top: solid 2px #000"
|rowspan=11|KansasStatehood in 1861
|rowspan = 5|Saint-LouisSan LuisSt. Louis (MO)||1765||Capital of the Spanish (though predominantly Francophone) district of Alta Louisiana.
|-
|1800||Capital of the French district of La Haute-Louisiane.
|-
|1804||Capital of the District of Louisiana (under the authority of the Indiana Territory).
|-
|1805||Capital of the Louisiana Territory.
|-
|1812||Capital of the Missouri Territory (1812–1821).
|-
|Pawnee||1855||Capital of the Kansas Territory (July 2 – 6).
|-
|Shawnee Mission||1855||Capital of the Kansas Territory.
|-
|Lecompton||rowspan=2|1856||Capital de jure (pro-slavery) of the Territory of Kansas.
|-
|Topeka||Capital de facto (anti-slavery) of the Territory of Kansas.
|-
|Minneola||1858||Declared capital by territorial legislature, although this action was later declared void.
|-
|Topeka||1861||Capital of the State of Kansas.
|- style="border-top: solid 2px #000"
|rowspan=5|KentuckyStatehood in 1792
|rowspan=3|Williamsburg (VA)||1699||Capital of the English Colony of Virginia.
|-
|1707||Capital of the British Colony of Virginia.
|-
|1776||rowspan=2|Capital of the Commonwealth of Virginia.
|-
|Richmond (VA)||1780
|-
|Frankfort||1792||Capital of the Commonwealth of Kentucky.(The government initially met at Lexington but Frankfort was quickly named the capital. Bowling Green was the rival Confederate state capital 1861–62).
|- style="border-top: solid 2px #000"
|rowspan=15|LouisianaStatehood in 1812
|San Agustín (FL)||1565||Capital of the Spanish province of La Florida.
|-
|La Mobile (AL)||1702||rowspan=3|Capitals of the French colony of La Louisiane.
|-
|Bilocci (MS)||1720
|-
|rowspan=5|La Nouvelle-OrléansNueva OrleansNew Orleans||1722
|-
|1763||Capital of the Spanish district of Baja Louisiana.
|-
|1800||Capital of the French district of La Basse-Louisiane.
|-
|1804||Capital of the Territory of Orleans.
|-
|1812||rowspan=8|Capitals of the State of Louisiana.
|-
|Donaldsonville||1830
|-
|New Orleans||1831
|-
|Baton Rouge||1849
|-
|Opelousas||1862
|-
|Shreveport||1863
|-
|New Orleans||1865
|-
|Baton Rouge||1882
|- style="border-top: solid 2px #000"
|rowspan=14|MaineStatehood in 1820
|Île Sainte-Croix||1604||rowspan=2|Capitals of the French colony of l'Acadie.
|-
|Port-Royal (NS)||1605
|-
|rowspan=8|Boston (MA)||1630||Capital of the English Colony of Massachusetts Bay.
|-
|1686||Capital of the English Dominion of New-England in America.
|-
|1689||Capital of the dissident Colony of Massachusetts Bay.
|-
|1691||Capital of the English Province of Massachusetts Bay.
|-
|1707||Capital of the British Province of Massachusetts Bay.
|-
|1774||Capital of the dissident Province of Massachusetts Bay.
|-
|1776||Capital of the State of Massachusetts Bay.
|-
|1780||Capital of the Commonwealth of Massachusetts.
|-
|rowspan=2|Portland||1820||Capital of the State of Maine.
|-
|rowspan=2|1827||Capital de facto of the State of Maine.
|-
|rowspan=2|Augusta||Capital de jure of the State of Maine.
|-
|1832||Capital of the State of Maine.
|- style="border-top: solid 2px #000"
|rowspan=4|MarylandStatehood in 1776
|St. Mary's City||1634||Capital of the English proprietary Colony of Maryland.
|-
|rowspan=3|Anne Arundel's TowneAnnapolis||1694||Capital of the English Province of Maryland.
|-
|1707||Capital of the British Province of Maryland.
|-
|1776||Capital of the State of Maryland.(Capital of the United States of America 1783–1784.)
|- style="border-top: solid 2px #000"
|rowspan=10|MassachusettsStatehood in 1776
|Plimouth||1620||Capital of the English Colony of New-Plimouth 1620–1686.
|-
|rowspan=2|Boston||1630||Capital of the English Colony of Massachusetts Bay 1630–1686.
|-
|1686||Capital of the English Dominion of New-England in America 1686–1689.
|-
|Plimouth||1688||Capital of the dissident Colony of New-Plimouth 1688–1692.
|-
|rowspan=6|Boston||1689||Capital of the dissident Colony of Massachusetts Bay 1689–1692.
|-
|1692||Capital of the English Province of Massachusetts Bay.
|-
|1707||Capital of the British Province of Massachusetts Bay.
|-
|1774||Capital of the dissident Province of Massachusetts Bay.
|-
|1776||Capital of the State of Massachusetts Bay.
|-
|1780||Capital of the Commonwealth of Massachusetts.
|- style="border-top: solid 2px #000"
|rowspan=7|MichiganStatehood in 1837
|Marietta (OH)||1788||rowspan=2|Capitals of the Territory Northwest of the River Ohio (all of Michigan 1788–1800, eastern Michigan 1800–1803).
|-
|Chillicothe (OH)||rowspan=2|1800
|-
|Vincennes (IN)||rowspan=2|Capitals of the Territory of Indiana (western Michigan 1800–1803; all of Michigan 1803–1805, a portion of the Upper Peninsula 1805–1816).
|-
|Corydon (IN)||1813
|-
|rowspan=2|Detroit||1805||Capital of the Territory of Michigan (Lower Peninsula 1805–1818, all of Michigan 1818–1837).(Detroit was occupied by British Armed Forces 1812–1813).
|-
|1837||rowspan=2|Capitals of the State of Michigan.
|-
|Lansing||1847
|- style="border-top: solid 2px #000"
|rowspan=16|MinnesotaStatehood in 1858
|rowspan=5|Saint-LouisSan LuisSt. Louis (MO)||1765||Capital of the Spanish (though predominantly Francophone) district of Alta Louisiana 1765–1800.
|-
|1800||Capital of the French district of la Haute-Louisiane (west of Mississippi River 1800–1804).
|-
|1804||Capital of the District of Louisiana (west of Mississippi River under the authority of the Indiana Territory 1804–1805).
|-
|1805||Capital of the Territory of Louisiana (west of Mississippi River 1805–1812).
|-
|1812||Capital of the Territory of Missouri (west of Mississippi River 1812–1821).
|-
|Marietta (OH)||1788||Capital of the Territory Northwest of the River Ohio (east of Mississippi River 1788–1800).
|-
|Vincennes (IN)||1800||Capital of the Territory of Indiana (east of Mississippi River 1800–1809).
|-
|Kaskaskia (IL)||1809||Capital of the Territory of Illinois (east of Mississippi River 1809–1818).
|-
|Detroit (MI)||1818||Capital of the Territory of Michigan (east of Mississippi River 1818–1834, all of Minnesota 1834–1836).
|-
|Belmont (WI)||1836||rowspan=2|Capitals of the Territory of Wisconsin.
|-
|rowspan=2|Burlington (IA)||1837
|-
|rowspan=2|1838||Capital of the Territory of Iowa (west of Mississippi River 1838–1841).
|-
|Madison (WI)||Capital of the Territory of Wisconsin (east of Mississippi River 1838–1848).
|-
|Iowa City (IA)||1841||Capital of the Territory of Iowa (west of Mississippi River 1841–1846).
|-
|rowspan=2|Saint Paul||1849||Capital of the Territory of Minnesota.
|-
|1858||Capital of the State of Minnesota.
|- style="border-top: solid 2px #000"
|rowspan=16|MississippiStatehood in 1817
|San Agustín (FL)||1565||Capital of the Spanish province of La Florida.
|-
|rowspan=3|Savannah (GA)||1733||Capital of the British proprietary Colony of Georgia.
|-
|1755||Capital of the British Province of Georgia.
|-
|1776||rowspan=9|Capitals of the State of Georgia.
|-
|Augusta (GA)||1778
|-
|Heard's Fort (GA)||1780
|-
|Augusta (GA)||1781
|-
|Savannah (GA)||1782
|-
|Ebenezer (GA)||1782
|-
|Savannah (GA)||1784
|-
|Augusta (GA)||1786
|-
|Louisville (GA)||1796
|-
|Natchez||1798||rowspan=2|Capitals of the Territory of Mississippi.
|-
|Washington||1802
|-
|Natchez||1817||rowspan=2|Capitals of the State of Mississippi.
|-
|Jackson||1821
|-
|- style="border-top: solid 2px #000"
|rowspan=7|MissouriStatehood in 1821
|rowspan = 5|Saint-LouisSan LuisSt. Louis||1765||Capital of the Spanish (though predominantly Francophone) district of Alta Louisiana.
|-
|1800||Capital of the French district of La Haute-Louisiane.
|-
|1804||Capital of the District of Louisiana (under the authority of the Indiana Territory).
|-
|1805||Capital of the Louisiana Territory.
|-
|1812||Capital of the Missouri Territory.
|-
|Saint Charles||1821||rowspan =2|Capitals of the State of Missouri.(A Confederate state government in exile operated from Neosho 1861–1863, and from Marshall, Texas, 1863–1865).
|-
|Jefferson City||1826
|- style="border-top: solid 2px #000"
|rowspan=17|MontanaStatehood in 1889
|rowspan = 5|Saint-LouisSan LuisSt. Louis (MO)||1765||Capital of the Spanish (though predominantly Francophone) district of Alta Louisiana (east of Continental Divide 1763–1800.)
|-
|1800||Capital of the French district of la Haute-Louisiane (east of Continental Divide 1800–1804).
|-
|1804||Capital of the District of Louisiana (east of Continental Divide under the authority of the Indiana Territory 1804–1805).
|-
|1805||Capital of the Territory of Louisiana (east of Continental Divide 1805–1812).
|-
|1812||Capital of the Territory of Missouri (east of Continental Divide 1812–1821).
|-
|Fort Vancouver (WA)||1825||Capital de facto of the Oregon Country (west of Continental Divide 1818–1843).
|-
|rowspan=2|Oregon City (OR)||1843||Capital of the Provisional Government of Oregon (west of Continental Divide 1843–1848).
|-
|1848||rowspan=2|Capitals of the Territory of Oregon (west of Continental Divide 1848–1853).
|-
|Salem (OR)||1851
|-
|Olympia (WA)||1853||Capital of the Territory of Washington (west of Continental Divide 1853–1863).
|-
|Omaha (NE)||1854||Capital of the Territory of Nebraska (east of Continental Divide 1854–1861).
|-
|Yankton (SD)||1861||Capital of the Territory of Dakota (east of Continental Divide 1861–1863).
|-
|Lewiston (ID)||1863||Capital of the Territory of Idaho.
|-
|Bannack||1864||rowspan=3|Capitals of the Territory of Montana.
|-
|Virginia City||1865
|-
|rowspan=2|Helena||1875
|-
|1889||Capital of the State of Montana.
|- style="border-top: solid 2px #000"
|rowspan=8|NebraskaStatehood in 1867
|rowspan = 5|Saint-LouisSan LuisSt. Louis (MO)||1765||Capital of the Spanish (though predominantly Francophone) district of Alta Louisiana.
|-
|1800||Capital of the French district of la Haute-Louisiane.
|-
|1804||Capital of the District of Louisiana (under the authority of the Indiana Territory).
|-
|1805||Capital of the Territory of Louisiana.
|-
|1812||Capital of the Territory of Missouri (1812–1821).
|-
|Omaha||1854||rowspan=2|Capitals of the Territory of Nebraska.
|-
|rowspan=2|LancasterLincoln||1867
|-
|1867||Capital of the State of Nebraska.
|- style="border-top: solid 2px #000"
|rowspan=5|NevadaStatehood in 1864
|Fillmore (UT)||1850||rowspan=2|Capitals of the Territory of Utah.
|-
|Salt Lake City (UT)||1858
|-
|Genoa||1861||Capital of the Territory of Nevada.
|-
|rowspan=2|Carson City||1861||Capital of the Territory of Nevada.
|-
|1864||Capital of the State of Nevada.
|- style="border-top: solid 2px #000"
|rowspan=11|New HampshireStatehood in 1776
|Boston (MA)||1630||Capital of the English Colony of Massachusetts Bay.
|-
|Portsmouth||1680||Capital of the English Province of New Hampshire.
|-
|Boston (MA)||1686||Capital of the English Dominion of New-England in America.
|-
|rowspan=5|Portsmouth||1689||Capital of the dissident Province of New Hampshire.
|-
|1691||Capital of the English Province of New Hampshire.
|-
|1698||Capital of the English Province of New Hampshire under jurisdiction of the Royal Governor of the Province of Massachusetts Bay.
|-
|1707||Capital of the British Province of New Hampshire under jurisdiction of the Royal Governor of the Province of Massachusetts Bay.
|-
|1741||Capital of the British Province of New Hampshire.
|-
|rowspan=2|Exeter||1775||Capital of the Revolutionary War government of New Hampshire.
|-
|1776||rowspan=2|Capitals of the State of New Hampshire.
|-
|Concord||1808
|- style="border-top: solid 2px #000"
|rowspan=12|New JerseyStatehood in 1776
|rowspan=2|Fort Amsterdam (NY)||1625||Capital of the Dutch colony of New Netherland.
|-
|1652||Capital of the Dutch province of New Netherland.
|-
|Elizabethtown (now Elizabeth)||1665||Capital of the English Province of New Jersey.
|-
|Perth Amboy||rowspan=2|1673||Capital of the English Province of East Jersey 1673–1688.
|-
|Burlington||Capital of the English Province of West Jersey 1673–1688.
|-
|Boston (MA)||1688||Capital of the English Dominion of New-England in America 1688–1689.
|-
|Perth Amboy||rowspan=2|1689||Capital of the English Province of East Jersey 1689–1702.
|-
|Burlington||Capital of the English Province of West Jersey 1689–1702.
|-
|rowspan=3|joint capitals||1702||East Jersey and West Jersey were re-united as the English Province of New Jersey in 1702. Perth Amboy and Burlington served jointly as the capital until 1784.
|-
|1707||Joint capitals of the British Province of New Jersey.
|-
|1776||Joint capitals of the State of New Jersey.
|-
|Trenton||1784||Capital of the State of New Jersey.(Capital of the United States of America in 1784).
|- style="border-top: solid 2px #000"
|rowspan=10|New MexicoStatehood in 1912
|San Juan de los Caballeros||1598||rowspan=2|Capitals of the Spanish Virreinato de la Nueva España province of Santa Fe de Nuevo México.
|-
|La Villa Real de la Santa Fe de San Francisco de Asís||1610
|-
|El Paso del Norte (now Ciudad Juárez CHH)||1680||Capital of the Spanish Virreinato de la Nueva España province-in-exile of Santa Fe de Nuevo México (Pueblo Revolt 1680–1692).
|-
|rowspan=6|La Villa Real de la Santa Fé de San Francisco de AsísSanta Fe||1692||Capital of the Spanish Virreinato de la Nueva España province of Santa Fe de Nuevo México.
|-
|1821||Capital of the Mexican province of Santa Fe de Nuevo México.
|-
|1824||Capital of the Mexican territory of Santa Fe de Nuevo México.
|-
|1846||Capital of the U.S. military government of New Mexico 1846.
|-
|1846||Capital of the U.S. provisional government of New Mexico 1846–1850.
|-
|1850||Capital of the U.S. Territory of New Mexico 1850–1912.
|-
|Santa Fe||1912||Capital of the State of New Mexico.
|- style="border-top: solid 2px #000"
|rowspan=15|New YorkStatehood in 1776
|rowspan=5|Fort AmsterdamNieuw-AmsterdamNew-YorkNieuw-OranjeNew-York||1625||Capital of the Dutch colony of New Netherland (Novum Belgium).
|-
|1652||Capital of the Dutch province of New Netherland.
|-
|1664||Capital of the English Province of New York.
|-
|1673||Capital of the Dutch military government of New Netherland.
|-
|1674||Capital of the English Province of New York.
|-
|Boston (MA)||1688||Capital of the English Dominion of New-England in America.
|-
|rowspan=4|New-York||1689||Capital of the dissident government of New-York.
|-
|1691||Capital of the English Province of New York.
|-
|1707||Capital of the British Province of New York.
|-
|1776||rowspan=4|Capitals of the State of New York.
|-
|Kingston||1777
|-
|Hurley||1777
|-
|Poughkeepsie||1777
|-
|New York||1788||Capital of the State of New York.(Capital of the United States of America 1785–1788 and 1789–1790).
|-
|Albany||1797||Capital of the State of New York.
|- style="border-top: solid 2px #000"
|rowspan=7|North CarolinaStatehood in 1776
|San Agustín (FL)||1565||Capital of the Spanish province of la Florida.
|-
|rowspan=2|Charlestown (SC)||1670||Capital of the English Province of Carolina.
|-
|1707||Capital of the British Province of Carolina.
|-
|rowspan=2|New Bern||1712||Capital of the British Province of North Carolina.
|-
|1776||rowspan=3|Capitals of the State of North Carolina.
|-
|Fayetteville||1789
|-
|Raleigh||1794
|- style="border-top: solid 2px #000"
|rowspan=15|North DakotaStatehood in 1889
|rowspan = 5|Saint-LouisSan LuisSt. Louis (MO)||1765||Capital of the Spanish (though predominantly Francophone) district of Alta Louisiana.
|-
|1800||Capital of the French district of la Haute-Louisiane.
|-
|1804||Capital of the District of Louisiana (under the authority of the Indiana Territory).
|-
|1805||Capital of the Territory of Louisiana.
|-
|1812||Capital of the Territory of Missouri (1812–1821).
|-
|Detroit (MI)||1834||Capital of the Territory of Michigan (east of Missouri River and White Earth River 1834–1836).
|-
|Belmont (WI)||1836||rowspan=2|Capitals of the Territory of Wisconsin (east of Missouri River and White Earth River 1836–1838).
|-
|rowspan=2|Burlington (IA)||1837
|-
|1838||rowspan=2|Capitals of the Territory of Iowa (east of Missouri River and White Earth River 1838–1846).
|-
|Iowa City (IA)||1841
|-
|Saint Paul (MN)||1849||Capital of the Territory of Minnesota (east of Missouri River and White Earth River 1849–1858).
|-
|Omaha (NE)||1854||Capital of the Territory of Nebraska (west of Missouri River or White Earth River 1854–1861).
|-
|Yankton (SD)||1861||rowspan=2|Capitals of the Territory of Dakota.
|-
|rowspan=2|Bismarck||1883
|-
|1889||Capital of the State of North Dakota.
|- style="border-top: solid 2px #000"
|rowspan=6|OhioStatehood in 1803
|Marietta||1788||rowspan=2|Capitals of the Territory Northwest of the River Ohio.
|-
|rowspan=2|Chillicothe||1800
|-
|1803||rowspan=4|Capitals of the State of Ohio.
|-
|Zanesville||1810
|-
|Chillicothe||1812
|-
|Columbus||1816
|- style="border-top: solid 2px #000"
|rowspan=17|OklahomaStatehood in 1907
|rowspan = 5|Saint-LouisSan LuisSt. Louis (MO)||1765||Capital of the Spanish (though predominantly Francophone) district of Alta Louisiana.
|-
|1800||Capital of the French district of la Haute-Louisiane.
|-
|1804||Capital of the District of Louisiana (under the authority of the Indiana Territory).
|-
|1805||Capital of the Territory of Louisiana.
|-
|1812||Capital of the Territory of Missouri.
|-
|Arkansas Post (AR)||1819||rowspan=2|Capitals of the Territory of Arkansaw (south of the parallel 36°30' north 1819–1824, southeastern Oklahoma 1824–1828).
|-
|Little Rock (AR)||1821
|-
|Fort Gibson||1824||De facto capital of the Indian Territory.
|-
|Tahlequah||1838||Capital of the Cherokee Nation.
|-
|Tuskahoma||1838||Capital of the Choctaw Nation.
|-
|Tishomingo||1855||Capital of the Chickasaw Nation.
|-
|Wewoka||1866||Capital of the Seminole Nation.
|-
|Okmulgee||1867||Capital of the Creek Nation.
|-
|Pawhuska||1872||Capital of the Osage Nation.
|-
|rowspan=2|Guthrie||1889||Capital of the Territory of Oklahoma.
|-
|1907||rowspan=2|Capitals of the State of Oklahoma.
|-
|Oklahoma City||1910
|- style="border-top: solid 2px #000"
|rowspan=7|OregonStatehood in 1859
|Champoeg||1843||Temporary capital of the disputed Oregon Country.
|-
|rowspan=2|Oregon City||1843||Capital of the Provisional Government of Oregon in the Oregon Country.
|-
|1848||rowspan=4|Capitals of the Territory of Oregon.
|-
|Salem||1851
|-
|Corvallis||1855
|-
|rowspan=2|Salem||1855
|-
|1859||Capital of the State of Oregon.
|- style="border-top: solid 2px #000"
|rowspan=5|PennsylvaniaStatehood in 1776
|rowspan=3|Philadelphia||1682||Capital of the English proprietary Colony of Pennsylvania.
|-
|1707||Capital of the British proprietary Colony of Pennsylvania.
|-
|1776||Capital of the Commonwealth of Pennsylvania.(Capital of the United States of America 1776, 1777, 1778–1783, and 1790–1800).
|-
|Lancaster||1799||Capital of the Commonwealth of Pennsylvania.(Capital of the United States of America 1777).
|-
|Harrisburg||1812||Capital of the Commonwealth of Pennsylvania.
|- style="border-top: solid 2px #000"
|rowspan=10|Rhode IslandStatehood in 1776
|Providence||1636||Capital of the English Colony of Providence 1636–1644.
|-
|rowspan=2|Portsmouth||1639||Capital of the English Colony of Aquidneck Island 1639–1644.
|-
|1644||Capital of the English Colony of Rhode Island.
|-
|Providence||1644||Capital of the English Colony of Rhode Island and Providence Plantations.
|-
|Boston (MA)||1686||Capital of the English Dominion of New-England in America.
|-
|rowspan=2|Providence||1689||Capital of the English Colony of Rhode Island and Providence Plantations.
|-
|1707||Capital of the British Colony of Rhode Island and Providence Plantations.
|-
|five capitals||1776||From 1776 to 1853, the legislature of the State of Rhode Island and Providence Plantations rotated among the county seats of the state's five counties: Providence, Newport, East Greenwich, South Kingstown, and Bristol.
|-
|joint capitals||1854||From 1854 to 1899, the legislature of the State of Rhode Island and Providence Plantations alternated sessions between Providence and Newport.
|-
|Providence||1900||Capital of the State of Rhode Island.
|- style="border-top: solid 2px #000"
|rowspan=6|South CarolinaStatehood in 1776
|San Agustín (FL)||1565||Capital of the Spanish province of la Florida.
|-
|rowspan=4|Charlestown||1670||Capital of the English Province of Carolina.
|-
|1707||Capital of the British Province of Carolina.
|-
|1712||Capital of the British Province of South Carolina.
|-
|1776||rowspan=2|Capitals of the State of South Carolina.
|-
|Columbia||1786
|- style="border-top: solid 2px #000"
|rowspan=15|South DakotaStatehood in 1889
|rowspan = 5|Saint-LouisSan LuisSt. Louis (MO)||1765||Capital of the Spanish (though predominantly Francophone) district of Alta Louisiana.
|-
|1800||Capital of the French district of la Haute-Louisiane.
|-
|1804||Capital of the District of Louisiana (under the authority of the Indiana Territory.)
|-
|1805||Capital of the Territory of Louisiana.
|-
|1812||Capital of the Territory of Missouri (1812–1821).
|-
|Detroit (MI)||1834||Capital of the Territory of Michigan (east of Missouri River 1834–1836).
|-
|Belmont (WI)||1836||rowspan=2|Capitals of the Territory of Wisconsin (east of Missouri River 1836–1838).
|-
|rowspan=2|Burlington (IA)||1837
|-
|1838||rowspan=2|Capitals of the Territory of Iowa (east of Missouri River 1838–1846).
|-
|Iowa City (IA)||1841
|-
|Saint Paul (MN)||1849||Capital of the Territory of Minnesota (east of Missouri River 1849–1858).
|-
|Omaha (NE)||1854||Capital of the Territory of Nebraska (west of Missouri River 1854–1861).
|-
|Yankton||1861||rowspan=2|Capitals of the Territory of Dakota.
|-
|Bismarck (ND)||1883
|-
|Pierre||1889||Capital of the State of South Dakota.
|- style="border-top: solid 2px #000"
|rowspan=11|TennesseeStatehood in 1796
|rowspan=2|New Bern (NC)||1712||Capital of the British Province of North Carolina.
|-
|1776||Capital of the State of North Carolina.
|-
|Rocky Mount||1790||rowspan=2|Capitals of the Territory South of the River Ohio.
|-
|rowspan=2|White's FortKnoxville||1791
|-
|1796||Capital of the State of Tennessee.
|-
|Kingston||1807||Capital of the State of Tennessee for one day in 1807 to fulfill treaty obligations with the Cherokee Nation.
|-
|Knoxville||1807||rowspan=5|Capitals of the State of Tennessee.
|-
|Nashville||1812
|-
|Knoxville||1817
|-
|Murfreesboro||1818
|-
|Nashville||1826
|- style="border-top: solid 2px #000"
|rowspan=13|TexasStatehood in 1845
|Los Adaes (LA)||1729||rowspan=2|Capitals of the Spanish province of Tejas.
|-
|San Antonio de Béxar (now San Antonio)||1772
|-
|Saltillo (COA)||1824||rowspan=2|Capitals of the Mexican province of Coahuila y Tejas.
|-
|Monclova (COA)||1833
|-
|San Felipe de Austin||1835||rowspan=1|Capital of the Provisional Government of Texas.
|-
|Washington (now Washington-on-the-Brazos)||1836||rowspan=7|Capitals of the Republic of Texas.
|-
|Galveston||1836
|-
|Harrisburg||1836
|-
|Velasco||1836
|-
|Columbia||1836
|-
|Houston||1837
|-
|rowspan=2|Austin||1839
|-
|1845||Capital of the State of Texas.
|- style="border-top: solid 2px #000"
|rowspan=4|UtahStatehood in 1896
|Salt Lake City||1849||Capital of the extralegal State of Deseret.
|-
|Fillmore||1850||rowspan=2|Capitals of the Territory of Utah.
|-
|rowspan=2|Salt Lake City||1858
|-
|1896||Capital of the State of Utah.
|- style="border-top: solid 2px #000"
|rowspan=5|VermontStatehood in 1791
|Westminster||1777||rowspan=2|Capitals of the Republic of New Connecticut.
|-
|rowspan=3|Windsor||1777
|-
|1777||Capital of the Vermont Republic.
|-
|1791||rowspan=2|Capitals of the State of Vermont.
|-
|Montpelier||1805
|- style="border-top: solid 2px #000"
|rowspan=5|VirginiaStatehood in 1776
|Jamestown||1619||rowspan=2|Capitals of the English Colony of Virginia.
|-
|rowspan=3|Middle PlantationWilliamsburg||1698
|-
|1707||Capital of the British Colony of Virginia.
|-
|1776||Capital of the Commonwealth of Virginia.
|-
|Richmond||1780||Capital of the Commonwealth of Virginia.(Capital of the Confederate States of America 1861–1865.)(A rival pro-Union state government operated from Wheeling 1861–1863 and from Alexandria 1863–1865).
|- style="border-top: solid 2px #000"
|rowspan=6|WashingtonStatehood in 1889
|Champoeg (OR)||1843||Temporary capital of the disputed Oregon Country.
|-
|rowspan=2|Oregon City (OR)||1843||Capital of the Provisional Government of Oregon in the Oregon Country.
|-
|1848||rowspan=2|Capitals of the Territory of Oregon.
|-
|Salem (OR)||1851
|-
|rowspan=2|Olympia||1853||Capital of the Territory of Washington.
|-
|1889||Capital of the State of Washington.
|- style="border-top: solid 2px #000"
|rowspan=10|West VirginiaStatehood in 1863
|Jamestown (VA)||1619||rowspan=2|Capitals of the English Colony of Virginia.
|-
|rowspan=3|Middle Plantation (VA)Williamsburg (VA)||1698
|-
|1707||Capital of the British Colony of Virginia.
|-
|1776||rowspan=2|Capitals of the Commonwealth of Virginia.
|-
|Richmond (VA)||1780
|-
|rowspan=2|Wheeling||1861||Capital of the rival pro-Union government of the Commonwealth of Virginia.
|-
|1863||rowspan=4|Capitals of the State of West Virginia.
|-
|Charleston||1870
|-
|Wheeling||1875
|-
|Charleston||1885
|- style="border-top: solid 2px #000"
|rowspan=8|WisconsinStatehood in 1848
|Marietta (OH)||1788||Capital of the Territory Northwest of the River Ohio.
|-
|Vincennes (IN)||1800||Capital of the Territory of Indiana.
|-
|Kaskaskia (IL)||1809||Capital of the Territory of Illinois.
|-
|Detroit (MI)||1818||Capital of the Territory of Michigan.
|-
|Belmont||1836||rowspan=3|Capitals of the Territory of Wisconsin.
|-
|Burlington (IA)||1837
|-
|rowspan=2|Madison||1838
|-
|1848||Capital of the State of Wisconsin.
|- style="border-top: solid 2px #000"
|rowspan=4|WyomingStatehood in 1890
|Lewiston (ID)||1863||Capital of the Territory of Idaho.
|-
|Yankton (SD)||1864||Capital of the Territory of Dakota.
|-
|rowspan=2|Cheyenne||1869||Capital of the Territory of Wyoming.
|-
|1890||Capital of the State of Wyoming'.
|-
|}

See also
History of the United States
List of largest cities of U.S. states and territories by population
List of state and territorial capitols in the United States
List of states and territories of the United States
Lists of capitals
Outline of United States history
Relocation of the United States Government to Trenton (1799)
Territorial evolution of the United States
Territories of the United States
Timeline of geopolitical changes

 Explanatory notes

References

Further reading
 Christian Montes. American Capitals: A Historical Geography'' (University of Chicago Press; 2014) 394 pages; scholarly study of geographic and other factors that have shaped the designation of capitals in all 50 states

External links

Florida Facts - The Capitol
The Capitalization of Georgia
The State Houses of Louisiana
Las Vegas: Nevada's Next State Capital?
New Hampshire Senate for Kids - Capitals
Handbook of Texas Online – Capitals
Colonial Capitals of the Dominion of Virginia
Utah History To Go - Utah's Capitols

Lists of cities in the United States
States of the United States-related lists
United States
United States
State capitals in the United States